Khoorangan (also Romanized as Khürangän) is a village in Now Bandegan Rural District, Fasa County, Fars Province, Iran. At the 2006 census, its population was 2,619, in 626 families.

References 

Populated places in Fasa County